The  New Democratic Forces (NFD) is a political party in Guinea. The party won three seats at the 2020 parliamentary election.

References

Political parties in Guinea